|}

The Alanna Homes Champion Novice Hurdle is a Grade 1 National Hunt hurdle race in Ireland which is open to horses aged four years or older. It is run at Punchestown over a distance of about 2 miles and 4 furlongs (4,023 metres), and during its running there are twelve hurdles to be jumped. The race is for novice hurdlers, and it is scheduled to take place each year during the Punchestown Festival in late April or early May.

Previous sponsors of the race have included Menolly Homes, Dunboyne Castle Hotel and Land Rover. Swordlestown Stud, sponsored the race from 2010 to 2012 and it was named in memory of the stud's former owner Cathal Ryan. Tattersalls Ireland sponsored the race from 2013 to 2017 while Profile Systems were the 2018 sponsors. The current sponsor, Alanna Homes, began sponsoring the race in 2019.

The field usually includes horses which ran previously in the Ballymore Novices' Hurdle at Cheltenham, and the last to win both races was Mikael d'Haguenet in 2009.

Records
Leading jockey since 1995 (8 wins):
 Ruby Walsh – Davenport  (2002), Nobody Told Me (2003), Sadlers Wings (2004), Nicanor (2006), Glencove Marina (2007), Mikael d'Haguenet (2009), Vautour (2014), Nichols Canyon (2015)

Leading trainer since 1995 (11 wins):
 Willie Mullins – Davenport  (2002), Nobody Told Me (2003), Sadlers Wings (2004), Glencove Marina (2007), Mikael d'Haguenet (2009), Un Atout (2013), Vautour (2014), Nichols Canyon (2015), Bacardys (2017), Gaillard Du Mesnil (2021), State Man (2022)

Winners since 1995

See also
 Horse racing in Ireland
 List of Irish National Hunt races

References

 Racing Post:

 pedigreequery.com – Dunboyne Castle Champion Novice Hurdle – Punchestown.
 pedigreequery.com – Land Rover Champion Novice Hurdle – Punchestown.
 racenewsonline.co.uk – Racenews Archive (April 25, 2003).

National Hunt races in Ireland
National Hunt hurdle races
Punchestown Racecourse